Milica McMillen (born July 13, 1993) is an American professional ice hockey player. McMillen was drafted by the Connecticut Whale of the Premier Hockey Federation (PHF) in 2015, and joined the New York Riveters franchise for the 2016–17 NWHL season.

Career
During college, McMillen played for University of Minnesota for four seasons between 2013 and 2016 in NCAA Division I college women's ice hockey.

Premier Hockey Federation
In 2015, McMillen was drafted 10th overall by the Connecticut Whale in the first-ever PHF draft. In June 2016, McMillen signed a one-contract worth $17,000 to play in the 2016/17 NWHL season with the New York Riveters. As part of the deal, the Connecticut Whale received $2,000 towards their salary cap from the Riveters.

References

External links
 

1993 births
American women's ice hockey defensemen
Living people
New York Riveters players
Minnesota Golden Gophers women's ice hockey players